The 1991 Virginia Cavaliers football team represented the University of Virginia during the 1991 NCAA Division I-A football season. The Cavaliers were led by 10th-year head coach George Welsh and played their home games at Scott Stadium in Charlottesville, Virginia. They competed as members of the Atlantic Coast Conference, finishing in fourth. Virginia was invited to the Gator Bowl, where they lost to Oklahoma.

Schedule

Roster

References

Virginia
Virginia Cavaliers football seasons
Virginia Cavaliers football